Antonio Núñez Jiménez was a Cuban geographer, speleologist, archaeologist, scientist and revolutionary. 

Núñez was born in Alquízar, Havana Province (current Artemisa Province) on April 20, 1923. In 1950, he received his first doctorate from the University of Havana, and later received a second doctorate from the Lomonosov Moscow State University of Moscow. 

In 1995, the Speleological Society of Cuba and the Cuban Society of Geography awarded him the title of "fourth discoverer of Cuba", placing him at the height of men such as Christopher Columbus, Alexander von Humboldt and Fernando Ortiz, for his contribution in the field of underground Cuba.

Considered the father of Cuban Speleology.  In the 1950s he discovered the largest cave in the country: the Great Cavern of Santo Tomás.  He participated in numerous scientific expeditions such as those to the North Pole, Antarctica, Easter Island, the Galapagos, and En Canoa del Amazonas al Caribe.

First president of the Cuban Academy of Sciences and founding president of the Speleological Federation of Latin America and the Caribbean and of various national and international scientific societies.

Internationally known for his scientific work in the field of Geographical Sciences, especially in Speleology, one of his greatest passions, and in geohistorical issues of the most dissimilar regions of the planet. Creator of the Foundation of Nature and Man.

His studies contributed to preparing the theater of operations, where Column 8 "Ciro Redondo" would later arrive in 1958 in the Cuban Revolution, and there he was appointed Captain of the Rebel Army.  He participates in the liberation of Fomento, Cabaiguán, Placetas, Remedios, Caibarién and Santa Clara, under the command of Ernesto Che Guevara.

His literary work is extensive with more than 190 books and pamphlets and 1,665 articles, as well as documentaries, interviews, and others.

Death
Núñez died in Havana on September 13, 1998. His work is highly respected in Cuban government circles.

References

Núñez Jiménez, Antonio, 1959, Geografía de Cuba. Lex. Havana.
Marrero, Levi, 1981, 5th edition "Geografía de Cuba" La Moderna Poesía, Coral Gables Florida.

External links
Antonio Núñez Jiménez and his expedition to Camagüey

Cuban revolutionaries
1923 births
1998 deaths
People of the Cuban Revolution
University of Havana alumni